Axia nesiota is a species of moth of the family Cimeliidae first described by Hans Reisser in 1962. It is found on Crete and in mainland Greece.

The larvae feed on Euphorbia species.

References

Moths described in 1962
Cimeliidae
Moths of Europe